Hart Township may refer to:

 Hart Township, Warrick County, Indiana
 Hart Township, Michigan
 Hart Township, Winona County, Minnesota
 Hart Township, Wright County, Missouri
 Hart Township, Roberts County, South Dakota, in Roberts County, South Dakota

See also
 Hart Lake Township, Minnesota
 Hartford Township (disambiguation)
 Hartland Township (disambiguation)

Township name disambiguation pages